Plumatella is a genus of bryozoans from family Plumatellidae.

Species
Species: 

 Plumatella agilis
 Plumatella bigemmis
 Plumatella bushnelli
 Plumatella casmiana
 Plumatella crassipes
 Plumatella emarginata
 Plumatella fruticosa
 Plumatella fungosa
 Plumatella ganapati
 Plumatella geimermassardi
 Plumatella incrustata
 Plumatella javanica
 Plumatella longa
 Plumatella longigemmis
 Plumatella marcusi
 Plumatella marlieri
 Plumatella mukaii
 Plumatella nitens
 Plumatella nodulosa
 Plumatella patagonica
 Plumatella princeps
 Plumatella pseudostolonata
 Plumatella recluse
 Plumatella repens
 Plumatella reticulata
 Plumatella rieki
 Plumatella ruandensis
 Plumatella serrulata
 Plumatella similirepens
 Plumatella siolii
 Plumatella stricta
 Plumatella suwana
 Plumatella tanganyikae
 Plumatella vaihiriae
 Plumatella velata
 Plumatella vorstmani

References

Bryozoan genera
Phylactolaemata